Anneke Esaiasdochter (also Anna Jansz, Anneken Jans or Anneke van Rotterdam; 1509–1539), was a Dutch Anabaptist executed as a heretic and at the time regarded as a Protestant martyr.

Life
Anna Jansz was born in Brielle on the Dutch island of Putten Voorne-Putten in 1509 or 1510. She was executed for heresy by drowning because of her connection to David Joris on January 24, 1539. She is the subject of poems, a novel and was regarded in the propaganda as a Protestant martyr. A description of her martyrdom is the basis of song number 18 of the Ausbund. In the time of the Münster Rebellion between 1534 and 1536, she wrote the Trumpet Song (Ick hoorde de Basuyne blasen), a song influenced by the apocalyptic revolutionary spirit of the Dutch Anabaptist movement of the time, inspired by the writings of Bernhard Rothmann. The Trumpet Song was published for the first time in Een Geesteliick Liedt-Boecken by David Joris in 1539.  She is the author of a "spiritual will", which was published in 1562.

References 
 http://www.inghist.nl/Onderzoek/Projecten/DVN/lemmata/data/Esaiasdr

Further reading 

 Werner O. Packull: Anna Jansz of Rotterdam, in Profiles of Anabaptist Women: Sixteenth-Century Reforming Pioneers, edited by C. Arnold Snyder, Linda A. Huebert Hecht. Waterloo, Ontario 1996. S. 336–351.
 Werner O. Packull: Anna Jansz of Rotterdam, a Historical Investigation of an Early Anabaptist Heroine. In: Archiv für Reformationsgeschichte 78 (1987), S. 147–173.

External links 

 Christian Neff, Nanne van der Zijpp: Anneken Jans  in the Global Anabaptist Mennonite Encyclopedia Online

1509 births
1539 deaths
16th-century Dutch people
Dutch Anabaptists
Executed Dutch women
People executed for heresy
People from Brielle
16th-century executions by Spain
16th-century Protestant martyrs
People of the Protestant Reformation